John Chester Hammond ( - ) was a Northampton, Massachusetts lawyer and later Northwestern District Attorney of the Commonwealth of Massachusetts.  He employed recent Amherst College graduate (and later US President) Calvin Coolidge in his firm Hammond & Field in 1895.

Coolidge said of Hammond in his 1929 autobiography, "He was a lawyer of great learning and wide business experience, with a remarkable ability in the preparation of pleadings and an insight that soon brought him to the crucial point of a case. He was massive and strong rather than elegant, and placed great stress on accuracy. He presented a cause in court with ability and skill."

Hammond had served as President of Massachusetts Bar in 1913, and was Dean of the Hampshire County Bar for several years prior. He died in the shingle-style Queen Anne home he had built in 1891, located in the now-named Elm Street Historic District of Northampton, Massachusetts.

References

1842 births
1926 deaths
Calvin Coolidge
Northampton, Massachusetts
People from Northampton, Massachusetts
People from Amherst, Massachusetts
Massachusetts lawyers